Rajinovac is a Serbian Orthodox monastery located in the south end of Begaljica. While its date of founding is not known, it was first mentioned in the year 1528 in the Ottoman census of the Belgrade municipalities, listed as "Monastery of saint Rajko" - Manastir Svetog Rajka.
The first major renovation of the monastery and church was completed by Knez of Begaljica Stevan Andrejević- Knez Palalija in the year 1793. The church is dedicated to the Nativity of the Mother of God.

References

External links
 Манастир Рајиновац - Православље - НОВИНЕ СРПСКЕ ПАТРИЈАРШИЈЕ

Serbian Orthodox monasteries in Belgrade
16th-century Serbian Orthodox church buildings
Grocka
Cultural Monuments of Great Importance (Serbia)